Berceni is a commune in the southeastern part of Ilfov county,
Muntenia,  Romania, composed of a single village, Berceni.

References

Communes in Ilfov County
Localities in Muntenia